KVBR (1340 AM, "Brainerd Business Radio") is a radio station broadcasting a news talk information format. Licensed to Brainerd, Minnesota, United States, the station serves the Brainerd area. Founded in 1964 by the Persons family, the station is owned by Hubbard Broadcasting, Inc., and features programming from USA Radio Network.

History
KVBR first went on the air on May 16, 1965, licensed to Greater Minnesota Broadcasting Corporation, Charlie Persons, president. The station changed its call sign from KVBR to KQBR on November 15, 1982, when the station was purchased by Jim and Larry Lakoduk of Fargo, North Dakota. The Lakoduks also owned KQWB AM-FM in Fargo and WEBC in Duluth, Minnesota. The station format was changed to full service country with the image "1340 Q-Country" under General Manager Chuck Whittman. The air staff for KQBR included Bob Randall (PD), Don Kelley (news), Barbara Ann, Don Jahnke, Charlie Kampa, Steve Sedall, H.P Thomas, Chuck Sargent, Dave Torkelson, Ken Adams and Jeff Butler. On August 15, 1986, the station returned its call sign to KVBR when the Lakoduks sold the station back to station founder Charlie Persons. The Persons family operated the station on a smaller scale than the Lakoduks, focusing on a news/talk format. Persons sold the station, as well as an FM construction permit, to Jim Ingstad's Sioux Valley Broadcasting, Inc., in March 1994. In April 1996, KVBR was sold to Kommerstad Communications Company, LLC. BL Broadcasting, Inc., a unit of Omni Broadcasting, acquired KVBR in January 2004, operating from studios located in Baxter, Minnesota.

Hubbard Broadcasting announced on November 13, 2014 that it would purchase the Omni Broadcasting stations, including KVBR. The sale was completed on February 27, 2015, at a purchase price of $8 million for the 16 stations and one translator.

References

External links

Radio stations in Minnesota
News and talk radio stations in the United States
Radio stations established in 1964
Hubbard Broadcasting
1964 establishments in Minnesota
Brainerd, Minnesota